Liz Edmiston (21 May 1945 – 10 April 2008) was a British actress.

She appeared in several TV series including Sentimental Education (1970), Now Take My Wife (1971), Dickens of London (1976) and Forgotten (1999), and starred opposite Jack Wild in the 1973 film The 14. She also made  appearances in episodes of Oh No, It's Selwyn Froggitt! (1974) and Keeping up Appearances (1993), and was married to fellow actor Eric Carte.

She was in poor health with diabetes from the age of 13, and died while acting on board the liner MV Oriana (1995).

External links 

Guardian obituary

British television actresses
1945 births
2008 deaths
Deaths onstage